The 2020 Top Seed Open was a professional women's tennis tournament that was played on outdoor hard courts at the Top Seed Tennis Club in Nicholasville, near Lexington, Kentucky. It was a WTA International-class tournament on the 2020 WTA Tour, and was the first American tournament of the Tour to be played since its suspension due to the COVID-19 pandemic.

The event was announced in early-July 2020 as one of two substitute events (alongside the 2020 Prague Open) for the Washington Open, whose organizers had declined to host the WTA Tour this season (the event was ultimately canceled later that month, citing the pandemic) in lieu of the regular US Open Series.

Points and prize money

Point distribution

Prize money 

*per team

Singles main draw entrants

Seeds 

 Rankings are as of March 16, 2020

Other entrants 
The following players received wildcards into the singles main draw:
  Caty McNally 
  Shelby Rogers
  Vera Zvonareva

The following player received entry using a protected ranking into the main draw:
  Catherine Bellis

The following players received entry from the qualifying draw:
  Kristie Ahn
  Caroline Dolehide
  Leylah Annie Fernandez
  Olga Govortsova
  Anna Kalinskaya
  Bethanie Mattek-Sands

The following player received entry as a lucky loser:
  Francesca Di Lorenzo

Withdrawals 
Before the tournament
  Zarina Diyas → replaced by  Misaki Doi
  Garbiñe Muguruza → replaced by  Venus Williams
  Amanda Anisimova → replaced by  Francesca Di Lorenzo

Doubles main draw entrants

Seeds 

 1 Rankings are as of March 16, 2020

Other entrants 
The following pairs received wildcards into the doubles main draw:
  Bethanie Mattek-Sands /  Sloane Stephens 
  Gabriela Talabă /  Caitlin Whoriskey

Champions

Singles 

  Jennifer Brady def.  Jil Teichmann, 6–3, 6–4

Doubles 

  Hayley Carter /  Luisa Stefani def.  Marie Bouzková /  Jil Teichmann, 6–1, 7–5

References

External links 
 Official website

Top Seed Open

2020 in American women's sports
Top Seed Open
Top Seed Open